WAFL may refer to:

Sport
 West Australian Football League, an Australian rules football league in Western Australia
 Wellington Australian Football League, an Australian rules football competition in Wellington, New Zealand
 Women's American Football League, a women's American football league

Other uses
 Write Anywhere File Layout, a file system designed by NetApp
 WAFL (FM), a radio station licensed to Milford, Delaware
 Workshop on Altaic Formal Linguistics, a linguistics conference

See also
 Waffle (disambiguation)